The Lego Masters Bricksmas Specials are the Christmas specials of the Australian reality television series Lego Masters. Hamish Blake and Ryan "The Brickman" McNaught returned as hosts for the specials. The first special, broadcast in two parts, aired on 21 and 28 November 2021. The second Christmas special, also a two-parter, aired on 20 and 27 November 2022.

The specials feature celebrities pairing up with past Lego Masters contestants to compete. Rather than a monetary prize, the winners receive a Christmas themed Lego trophy and $20,000 will be donated to Kmart’s Wishing Tree.

Production 
Celebrity contestants on the first special included Scott Cam, Brooke Boney, Sophie Monk and Michael (Wippa) Wipfli paired with returning Lego Masters contestants Michael from Season 3, Jay and Stani from Season 2 and Henry, one half of the Season 1 winning team.

During Nine’s 2023 upfronts, it was announced that a second Christmas special will air in the fourth quarter of 2022, with celebrities Poh Ling Yeow, Emma Watkins, Darren Palmer and Lincoln Lewis paired with returning Lego Masters contestants Gerhard “G” from Season 1, Alex from Season 2 and Fleur & Sarah from Season 3.

2021 Brickmas Special

Teams

Challenges

Challenge 1 

 Airdate - 21 November 2021
 Challenge: - Each of the four teams were tasked with creating a design for a Christmas shopfront window based on a minifig pick in 15 hours. Brickman gave each team 1 hour of help of their choice.
 Advantage - The winner of the challenge received an advantage, an hour of Hamish's time, for the Grand Finale.

Grand Finale 
 Airdate - 28 November 2021
 Challenge: - The four teams were tasked with creating a dream Lego set at minifig scale. Hamish built a grasshopper for Brooke and Michael as part of winning the challenge and receiving an advantage (the grasshopper was actually built by Brickman). Brickman again gave an hour of his time to each team.

NB Love Island, Lego Masters, Today and the Logie Awards.

Viewership

2022 Brickmas Special

Teams

Challenges

Challenge 1 

 Airdate - 20 November 2022
 Challenge: - Each of the four teams were tasked with building the inside surprise of a premade Lego Christmas cracker over 12 hours. Brickman gave each team 1 hour of help of their choice.
 Advantage - The winner received an advantage for the Grand Final challenge.

Grand Finale 
 Airdate - 27 November 2022
 Challenge: - Each of the four teams were tasked with building one of the items featured in the '9 Days of Bricksmas' carol over 12 hours. As the team with the advantage, Darren and Fleur had first choice of their selection. Brickman also gave each team 1 hour of his time for their builds.

Viewership

References 

Lego television series
Nine Network specials
2021 television episodes
2022 television episodes
Christmas television specials
2021 Australian television series debuts